Amanda Edwards is an American attorney and politician who served as a member of the Houston City Council. She is running to be the Mayor of Houston. She was also a candidate for the 2020 United States Senate election in Texas, in which she placed fifth in the Democratic primary.

Education and early career

Edwards was born and raised in Houston. After graduating from Eisenhower High School, she continued on to Emory University, where she earned a Bachelor of Arts in Political Science. While at Emory, Edwards served as president of the undergraduate student body and was later inducted into the Emory University Hall of Fame. She also spent her time at Emory assisting Georgia State Senator Connie Stokes. After graduating from Emory, Edwards moved to Washington D.C. and began working with Congresswoman Sheila Jackson Lee.

From here, she went on to attain a Juris Doctor from Harvard Law School. Edwards became a Criminal Justice Institute student attorney. She was also recognized with the Elaine Osborne Jacobson Award for her work in supporting underserved communities in healthcare law. This was in addition to her duties as the Co-Chair of the Harvard Black Law Students Association Spring Conference.

After graduation, her interest in public service led Edwards to relocate to New Orleans in the aftermath of Hurricane Katrina, where she served as a judicial law clerk for Federal District Court Judge Ivan Lemelle. While in New Orleans, Edwards founded Project NOW: The New Orleans Writing Project to teach New Orleans Youth use writing as a tool of empowerment after Hurricane Katrina.

Ultimately, Edwards returned to Houston, where she practiced as a municipal finance attorney. She has focused primarily on public finance, in which she assists in bond issuances, government partnerships, non-profit organizations, and community-development organizations.

Public office

Houston City Council 
Edwards ran for Houston City Council in 2015 for At-Large Position 4 and won, succeeding C.O. Bradford. In the runoff, she received more votes than anyone in the municipal election, including the mayor, Sylvester Turner. During her tenure, Edwards served on the Transportation, Technology, and Infrastructure Committee and the Economic Development Committee; additionally, she was the Vice Chair of the Budget and Fiscal Affairs Committee.

In the spring of 2016, Edwards authored an amendment for the city's annual budget process to create a task force for innovation and technology. She helped lead the efforts of the Task Force, which recommended, among other things, the creation of an innovation district. This new site, The Ion, will support the business district and accelerate investment in innovative technologies. She also pushed efforts for the City of Houston to commence smart city planning.

In addition to her work to support the innovation economy, Edwards initiated the creation of and led the Women- and Minority-Owned Business Task Force to identify ways to increase access to capital for women- and minority-owned businesses.

Edwards also served as the Co-Vice Chair of the High-Capacity Transit Task Force (a group organized under the Houston-Galveston Area Council) where she advocated for high capacity transit options for the 8 county Houston-Galveston region. This was alongside her proposal for the addition of light rail and rapid transit options to ease congestion on Houston's highways.

While on the Houston City Council, Edwards continued in disaster relief efforts after Houston was struck by Hurricane Harvey. She mobilized hundreds of volunteers to assist Harvey survivors by connecting them with help for flood damage, providing emergency supplies, case management and more.

Edwards launched the Council Member Edwards’ Community Empowerment Signature Series to empower Houstonians to “be the solution” with respect to issues impacting their respective communities. This series provided programmatic opportunities ranging from senior conferences to film screenings and townhalls that served to educate, empower, and equip members of the community with the tools and the drive necessary for enacting positive change.

Edwards declined to run for another term in order to run for the US Senate.

2020 U.S. Senate race 

In 2020, Edwards announced that she was running for John Cornyn's US Senate seat in the 2020 United States Senate election in Texas. After announcing, she was identified by local media as one of the seven candidates to watch, along with Chris Bell, Annie Garcia, MJ Hegar, Sema Hernandez, Cristina Tzintzún Ramirez, and Royce West in a crowded race of 12 total declared candidates.

Edwards ran as a moderate Democrat. Coming in fifth place in the Democratic primary, she did not qualify for the runoff election.

She endorsed West in the runoff.

Community involvement 
Amanda Edwards is the founder of a nonprofit called 'Be The Solution: a community empowerment organization' that effectively advocates and empowers various groups ranging from senior citizens to women. 
Amanda serves on the advisory council of Accelerator for America and has served on the Board of Directors for National League of Cities to Houston Exponential; and Project Row Houses. She is a member of the Houston Chapter of The Links, Inc. The Links; and a member of Alpha Kappa Alpha sorority.

References

Houston City Council members
Harvard Law School alumni
Emory University alumni
Living people
Women city councillors in Texas
African-American city council members in Texas
Texas Democrats
Year of birth missing (living people)
African-American women in politics
Candidates in the 2020 United States Senate elections
21st-century American politicians
21st-century American women politicians
21st-century African-American women
21st-century African-American politicians